Leonardo Alcantara Vieira commonly known as Léo Vieira or Leozinho is a Brazilian submission grappler and Brazilian Jiu-Jitsu instructor. He was born on March 23, 1976 in Rio de Janeiro Brazil.

He is the eldest of the Viera brothers (Ricardo and Leandro), who lead and fight for Checkmat.

Brazilian Jiu-Jitsu
Leo Vieira began training Jiu-Jitsu under Romero 'Jacare' Cavalcanti at the age of 6. He has won numerous medals, such as the Brazilian Jiu-Jitsu World Championships, Pan American Championships and the prestigious ADCC world championships. After being on break from Jiujitsu Gi competition, Vieira competed again on July 16, 2017 at the age of 41. He competed in Absolute Championship Berkut Jiu-Jitsu 6 in Moscow and lost the fight via terra footlock. On September 25, 2017, Vieira competed in the ADCC against former Ultimate Fighting Championship title contender, Chael Sonnen in the absolute division. Vieira lost the fight via referee's decision. Vieira returned after more time away from competition at BJJ Stars 7 on November 6, 2022, where he defeated Cleber Luciano 8-0 on points in a superfight.

In 2022, Vieira was hired as the Vice President of Grappling for ONE Championship.

CheckMat Jiu-Jitsu Team

One of the most successful teams in contemporary Brazilian Jiu-Jitsu, CheckMat's worldwide headquarters is in São Paulo, Brazil. CheckMat was established in 2008 by Leo and his brothers. Since its creation, Checkmat has become one of the top teams in Brazilian Jiu-Jitsu. Team CheckMat is the 2008 and 2009 NoGi World Champion Team. Team Checkmat also came in first for the Brazilian Nationals (Gi) 2010  and Brazilian Nationals (No-Gi) 2010.

Instructor lineage
Mitsuyo Maeda → Carlos Gracie, Sr. → Helio Gracie → Rolls Gracie → Romero Cavalcanti → Léo Vieira

References

External links
Official Vieira Bros Web Site
Bjjheroes.com

Living people
Brazilian practitioners of Brazilian jiu-jitsu
Sportspeople from Rio de Janeiro (state)
1976 births
World Brazilian Jiu-Jitsu Championship medalists
People awarded a black belt in Brazilian jiu-jitsu